In quantum mechanics, the spin–statistics theorem relates the intrinsic spin of a particle (angular momentum not due to the orbital motion) to the particle statistics it obeys. In units of the reduced Planck constant ħ, all particles that move in 3 dimensions have either integer spin or half-integer spin.

Background

Quantum states and indistinguishable particles
In a quantum system, a physical state is described by a state vector. A pair of distinct state vectors are physically equivalent if they differ only by an overall phase factor, ignoring other interactions. A pair of indistinguishable particles such as this have only one state. This means that if the positions of the particles are exchanged (i.e., they undergo a permutation), this does not identify a new physical state, but rather one matching the original physical state. In fact, one cannot tell which particle is in which position.

While the physical state does not change under the exchange of the particles' positions, it is possible for the state vector to change sign as a result of an exchange. Since this sign change is just an overall phase, this does not affect the physical state.

The essential ingredient in proving the spin-statistics relation is relativity, that the physical laws do not change under Lorentz transformations. The field operators transform under Lorentz transformations according to the spin of the particle that they create, by definition.

Additionally, the assumption (known as microcausality) that spacelike-separated fields either commute or anticommute can be made only for relativistic theories with a time direction. Otherwise, the notion of being spacelike is meaningless. However, the proof involves looking at a Euclidean version of spacetime, in which the time direction is treated as a spatial one, as will be now explained.

Lorentz transformations include 3-dimensional rotations and boosts. A boost transfers to a frame of reference with a different velocity and is mathematically like a rotation into time. By analytic continuation of the correlation functions of a quantum field theory, the time coordinate may become imaginary, and then boosts become rotations. The new "spacetime" has only spatial directions and is termed Euclidean.

Exchange symmetry or permutation symmetry

Bosons are particles whose wavefunction is symmetric under such an exchange or permutation, so if we swap the particles, the wavefunction does not change. Fermions are particles whose wavefunction is antisymmetric, so under such a swap the wavefunction gets a minus sign, meaning that the amplitude for two identical fermions to occupy the same state must be zero. This is the Pauli exclusion principle: two identical fermions cannot occupy the same state. This rule does not hold for bosons.

In quantum field theory, a state or a wavefunction is described by field operators operating on some basic state called the vacuum. In order for the operators to project out the symmetric or antisymmetric component of the creating wavefunction, they must have the appropriate commutation law. The operator

(with  an operator and  a numerical function) creates a two-particle state with wavefunction , and depending on the commutation properties of the fields, either only the antisymmetric parts or the symmetric parts matter.

Let us assume that  and the two operators take place at the same time; more generally, they may have spacelike separation, as is explained hereafter.

If the fields commute, meaning that the following holds:

then only the symmetric part of  contributes, so that , and the field will create bosonic particles.

On the other hand, if the fields anti-commute, meaning that  has the property that

then only the antisymmetric part of  contributes, so that , and the particles will be fermionic.

Naively, neither has anything to do with the spin, which determines the rotation properties of the particles, not the exchange properties.

Spin–statistics relation

The spin–statistics relation was first formulated in 1939 by Markus Fierz and was rederived in a more systematic way by Wolfgang Pauli. Fierz and Pauli argued their result by enumerating all free field theories subject to the requirement that there be quadratic forms for locally commuting observables including a positive-definite energy density. A more conceptual argument was provided by Julian Schwinger in 1950. Richard Feynman gave a demonstration by demanding unitarity for scattering as an external potential is varied, which when translated to field language is a condition on the quadratic operator that couples to the potential.

Theorem statement
The theorem states that:
 The wave function of a system of identical integer-spin particles has the same value when the positions of any two particles are swapped. Particles with wave functions symmetric under exchange are called bosons.
 The wave function of a system of identical half-integer–spin particles changes sign when two particles are swapped. Particles with wave functions antisymmetric under exchange are called fermions.
In other words, the spin–statistics theorem states that integer-spin particles are bosons, while half-integer–spin particles are fermions.

General discussion

Suggestive bogus argument
Consider the two-field operator product

where R is the matrix that rotates the spin polarization of the field by 180 degrees when one does a 180-degree rotation around some particular axis.

Now rotate this configuration by  around the origin. So we get

which for integer spin is equal to

and for half-integer spin is equal to

(proved at ). Hence we claim to have shown that, with respect to particle states:

So exchanging the order of two appropriately polarized operator insertions into the vacuum can be done by a rotation, at the cost of a sign in the half-integer case.

This argument by itself does not prove anything like the spin–statistics relation. To see why, consider a nonrelativistic spin-0 field described by a free Schrödinger equation. Such a field can be anticommuting or commuting. To see where it fails, consider that a nonrelativistic spin-0 field has no polarization, so that the product above is simply:

In order to have a nonzero matrix element, this operator product must be between states with two more particles on the right than on the left:

Performing the rotation, all that we learn is that rotating the 2-particle state  gives the same sign as changing the operator order. This gives no additional information, so this argument does not prove anything.

Why the bogus argument fails
To prove the spin–statistics theorem, it is necessary to use relativity, as is obvious from the consistency of the nonrelativistic spinless fermion, and the nonrelativistic spinning bosons. There are claims in the literature of proofs of the spin–statistics theorem that do not require relativity, but they are not proofs of a theorem, as the counterexamples show, rather they are arguments for why spin–statistics is "natural", while wrong-statistics is "unnatural". In relativity, the connection is required.

In relativity, there are no local fields that are pure creation operators or annihilation operators. Every local field both creates particles and annihilates the corresponding antiparticle. This means that in relativity, the product of the free real spin-0 field has a nonzero vacuum expectation value, because in addition to creating particles which are not annihilated and annihilating particles which are not subsequently created, it also includes a part that creates and annihilates "virtual" particles whose existence enters into interaction calculations – but never as scattering matrix indices or asymptotic states.

Proof

A π rotation in the Euclidean xt plane can be used to rotate vacuum expectation values of the field product of the previous section. The time rotation turns the argument of the previous section into the spin–statistics theorem.
 
The proof requires the following assumptions:
 The theory has a Lorentz-invariant Lagrangian.
 The vacuum is Lorentz-invariant.
 The particle is a localized excitation. Microscopically, it is not attached to a string or domain wall.
 The particle is propagating, meaning that it has a finite, not infinite, mass.
 The particle is a real excitation, meaning that states containing this particle have a positive-definite norm.

These assumptions are for the most part necessary, as the following examples show:

 The spinless anticommuting field shows that spinless fermions are nonrelativistically consistent. Likewise, the theory of a spinor commuting field shows that spinning bosons are too.
 This assumption may be weakened.
 In 2+1 dimensions, sources for the Chern–Simons theory can have exotic spins, despite the fact that the three-dimensional rotation group has only integer and half-integer spin representations.
 An ultralocal field can have either statistics independently of its spin. This is related to Lorentz invariance, since an infinitely massive particle is always nonrelativistic, and the spin decouples from the dynamics. Although colored quarks are attached to a QCD string and have infinite mass, the spin–statistics relation for quarks can be proved in the short distance limit.
 Gauge ghosts are spinless fermions, but they include states of negative norm.

Assumptions 1 and 2 imply that the theory is described by a path integral, and assumption 3 implies that there is a local field which creates the particle.

The rotation plane includes time, and a rotation in a plane involving time in the Euclidean theory defines a CPT transformation in the Minkowski theory. If the theory is described by a path integral, a CPT transformation takes states to their conjugates, so that the correlation function

must be positive definite at x=0 by assumption 5, the particle states have positive norm. The assumption of finite mass implies that this correlation function is nonzero for x spacelike. Lorentz invariance now allows the fields to be rotated inside the correlation function in the manner of the argument of the previous section:

Where the sign depends on the spin, as before. The CPT invariance, or Euclidean rotational invariance, of the correlation function guarantees that this is equal to G(x). So

for integer-spin fields and

for half-integer–spin fields.

Since the operators are spacelike separated, a different order can only create states that differ by a phase. The argument fixes the phase to be −1 or 1 according to the spin. Since it is possible to rotate the space-like separated polarizations independently by local perturbations, the phase should not depend on the polarization in appropriately chosen field coordinates.

This argument is due to Julian Schwinger.

An elementary explanation for the spin-statistics theorem cannot be given despite the fact that the theorem is so simple to state. In the Feynman Lectures on Physics, Richard Feynman said that this 
probably means that we do not have a complete understanding of the fundamental principle involved. see Further reading below.

To test the theorem, Drake carried out very precise calculations for states of the He atom that violate the Pauli exclusion principle; they are called paronic states. Later, the paronic state 1s2s 1S0 of He calculated by Drake was looked for using an atomic beam spectrometer. The search was unsuccessful with an upper limit of 5×10−6.

Consequences

Fermionic fields
The spin–statistics theorem implies that half-integer–spin particles are subject to the Pauli exclusion principle, while integer-spin particles are not. Only one fermion can occupy a given quantum state at any time, while the number of bosons that can occupy a quantum state is not restricted. The basic building blocks of matter such as protons, neutrons, and electrons are fermions. Particles such as the photon, which mediate forces between matter particles, are bosons.

The Fermi–Dirac distribution describing fermions leads to interesting properties. Since only one fermion can occupy a given quantum state, the lowest single-particle energy level for spin-1/2 fermions contains at most two particles, with the spins of the particles oppositely aligned. Thus, even at absolute zero, a system of more than two fermions in this case still has a significant amount of energy. As a result, such a fermionic system exerts an outward pressure. Even at non-zero temperatures, such a pressure can exist. This degeneracy pressure is responsible for keeping certain massive stars from collapsing due to gravity. See white dwarf, neutron star, and black hole.

Bosonic fields
There are a couple of interesting phenomena arising from the two types of statistics. The Bose–Einstein distribution which describes bosons leads to Bose–Einstein condensation. Below a certain temperature, most of the particles in a bosonic system will occupy the ground state (the state of lowest energy). Unusual properties such as superfluidity can result.

Ghost fields

Ghost fields do not obey the spin–statistics relation. See Klein transformation on how to patch up a loophole in the theorem.

Relation to representation theory of the Lorentz group
The Lorentz group has no non-trivial unitary representations of finite dimension. Thus it seems impossible to construct a Hilbert space in which all states have finite, non-zero spin and positive, Lorentz-invariant norm. This problem is overcome in different ways depending on particle spin–statistics.

For a state of integer spin the negative norm states (known as "unphysical polarization") are set to zero, which makes the use of gauge symmetry necessary.

For a state of half-integer spin the argument can be circumvented by having fermionic statistics.

Limitations: anyons in 2 dimensions

In 1982, physicist Frank Wilczek published a research paper on the possibilities of possible fractional-spin particles, which he termed anyons from their ability to take on "any" spin. He wrote that they were theoretically predicted to arise in low-dimensional systems where motion is restricted to fewer than three spatial dimensions. Wilczek described their spin statistics as "interpolating continuously between the usual boson and fermion cases". Evidence for the existence of anyons has been presented experimentally from 1985 through 2013, although it is not considered definitively established that all proposed kinds of anyons exist. Anyons are related to braid symmetry and topological states of matter.

See also
Parastatistics
Anyonic statistics
Braid statistics

References

Further reading

External links
 A nice nearly-proof at John Baez's home page
 Animation of the Dirac belt trick with a double belt, showing that belts behave as spin 1/2 particles
 Animation of a Dirac belt trick variant showing that spin 1/2 particles are fermions

Quantum field theory
Particle statistics
Statistical mechanics theorems
Articles containing proofs
Theorems in quantum mechanics